Ann Christy may refer to:
 Ann Christy (actress), American actress
 Ann Christy (singer), Belgian singer

See also
 Anna Christy, American opera singer
 Anna Christie (disambiguation)